2013–14 WBFAL was the second edition of Women Basketball Friendship Adriatic League. Participated six teams from three countries, champion became the team of Budućnost Podgorica.

Team information

Regular season

Final four
Final Four to be played from 4–5 April 2014 in Dubrovnik, Croatia.

2013-14
2013–14 in European women's basketball leagues
2013–14 in Bosnia and Herzegovina basketball
2013–14 in Croatian basketball
2013–14 in Montenegrin basketball